Asian American Studies is an academic discipline which critically examines the history, issues, sociology, religion, experiences, culture, and policies relevant to Asian Americans. It is closely related to other Ethnic Studies disciplines, such as African American Studies, Latino Studies, and Native American Studies.

History
Asian American Studies appeared as a field of intellectual inquiry in the late 1960s as a result of strikes by the Third World Liberation Front, a group of ethnic minority students at San Francisco State University and at the University of California, Berkeley. The students demanded that college classroom instruction include the histories of people of color in the United States, told from their perspectives. The demand for Ethnic Studies was originally a reaction against the Eurocentric bias in university curricula.

As a result of the 1968 strike, a College of Ethnic Studies (the only U.S. university academic department of its kind at the time) was established at San Francisco State University with American Indian Studies, Asian American Studies, Africana Studies, and Latino/a Studies as its four units, and a new Department of Ethnic Studies was established at the University of California, Berkeley, consisting of comparative ethnic studies, Asian American and Asian diaspora studies, Chicana/o and Latina/o studies, and Native American studies.

The demand for Asian American Studies resulted in the creation of new departments throughout the country since the 1970s. By 1979, the Association for Asian American Studies, a professional organization designed to promote teaching and research in the field, was established in 1979. Then in 1991, twenty-three college and universities formed an “East of California” caucus of the Association for Asian American Studies, to move away from a California-centered understanding of the field, to speak of the many origins and points of departure in the history of Asian American Studies, and to include research on less-studied communities like Filipino Americans and South Asian Americans into the field.

Topics
Drawing from numerous disciplines such as sociology, history, literature, political science, and gender studies, Asian American Studies scholars consider a variety of perspectives and employ diverse analytical tools in their work. Unlike Asian Studies which focuses on the history, culture, religion, etc. of Asian people living in Asia, Asian American Studies is interested in the history, culture, experiences, of Asians living in the United States.

Academic programs in Asian American Studies examines the history of Asian-Americans, which includes topics such as immigration and race-based exclusion policies. The discourse also includes studies on how first- and second-generation Asian Americans deal with adjustment and assimilation, especially on their Americanization and aggressive pursuit of higher education and prestigious occupations in a society that still discriminates against them.

Asian American Studies focuses on the identities, historical and contemporary experiences of individuals and groups in the United States. Concepts and issues that are crucial to this interdisciplinary curriculum include: Orientalism, diaspora and transnationalism, gender and sexuality, cultural politics, and media representation.

Universities and colleges with departments and programs

 Arizona State University
 Binghamton University
 Brandeis University
 California State University, Fullerton
 California State University, Long Beach
 California State University, Northridge
 City College of San Francisco
 College of William and Mary
 Columbia University
 Cornell University
 Duke University
 Hunter College, City University of New York
 New York University
 Northwestern University
 Queens College, City University of New York
 San Francisco State University
 State University of New York at Stony Brook
 St Cloud State University
 The Claremont Colleges
 Tufts University
 University of California, Berkeley
 University of California, Davis
 University of California, Irvine
 University of California, Los Angeles
 University of California, San Diego
 University of California, Santa Barbara
 University of Colorado at Boulder
 University of Illinois at Urbana–Champaign
 University of Maryland, College Park
 University of Minnesota
 University of Pennsylvania
 University of Southern California
 University of Texas at Austin
 University of Washington
 Vassar College

Prominent academics

 Roger Buckley, University of Connecticut
 Jeffery Paul Chan, San Francisco State University
 Lucie Cheng, UCLA
 E. J. R. David, University of Alaska
 Kip Fulbeck, University of California, Santa Barbara
 Emma Gee, UCLA
 Evelyn Nakano Glenn, University of California, Berkeley
 Daniel Phil Gonzales, San Francisco State University
 Haivan Hoang, UMass Amherst
 Madeline Y. Hsu, University of Texas at Austin
 Yuji Ichioka, UCLA
 Russell Jeung, San Francisco State University
 Jerry Kang, UCLA
 Nitasha Tamar Sharma, Northwestern University
 Elaine H. Kim, UC Berkeley
 Peter Kwong, Hunter College, CUNY Graduate Center
 Him Mark Lai, independent scholar
 Vinay Lal, UCLA
 Elizabeth Lew-Williams, Princeton University
 Russell Leong, UCLA
 Huping Ling, Truman State University
 David Wong Louie, UCLA
 Lisa Lowe, Yale University
 Martin F. Manalansan IV, University of Minnesota, Twin Cities
 Gary R. Mar, State University of New York at Stony Brook
 Kevin Nadal, City University of New York
 Lisa Nakamura, University of Illinois at Urbana–Champaign
 Don Nakanishi, UCLA
 Robert Nakamura, UCLA
 Mae Ngai, Columbia University
 Viet Thanh Nguyen, USC
 Gary Okihiro, Columbia University
 Michael Omi, University of California, Berkeley
 Rhacel Parrenas, Brown University
 Celine Parrenas Shimizu, University of California, Santa Barbara
 Robyn Rodriguez, University of California, Davis
 Alexander Saxton, UCLA
 Derald Wing Sue, Columbia University
 Betty Lee Sung, CUNY
 Ronald Takaki, University of California, Berkeley
 Shawn Wong, University of Washington
 David Yoo, UCLA
 Ji-Yeon Yuh, Northwestern University
 Judy Yung, University of California, Santa Cruz
 Min Zhou, UCLA

Celebrities who studied Asian American Studies

 Randall Park, UCLA
 Ali Wong, UCLA

References

External links
 Asian-Nation: Asian American History, Demographics, and News
 Association for Asian American Studies

American studies
Asian-American issues
Asian-American culture
Asian studies
Ethnic studies